A buzzer is a signalling device.

Buzzer or The Buzzer may also refer to:
Buzzer (whirligig), an ancient mechanical device used for ceremonial purposes and as a toy
Buzzer (G.I. Joe), a fictional character in the G.I. Joe universe
The Buzzer, nickname for radio station UVB-76
Buzzer beater, basketball term
Haufe Buzzer 2, motorglider
Buzzr, an American digital multicast television network
Jointer, A woodworking machine used to produce a flat surface along a board's length.